The courtyard houses of Shanxi or the Shanxi family compounds are located in Jinzhong, Shanxi Province, People's Republic of China, approximately 500 km south of Beijing. "These castle-like structures were constructed in the Qing dynasty by local merchants, and offer a glimpse into the architecture and traditional building techniques of the times."

List 
 Qiao's Courtyard Houses, Qi County
 Qu's Courtyard Houses, Qi County
 Wang's Courtyard Houses, Lingshi County
 Cao's Courtyard Houses, Taigu County
 Kong Xiangxi's Former Residence, Taigu County

World Heritage Status 

The first four of these sites were added to the UNESCO World Heritage Tentative List on March 28, 2008, in the Cultural category.

See also
 Siheyuan and courtyard house
 House of the Huangcheng Chancellor, in southern Shanxi

References

Citations

Bibliography
Shanxi Businessmen’s Courtyard Houses - UNESCO World Heritage Centre Accessed 2009-02-25.

Houses in China
Buildings and structures in Shanxi
Courtyards